The R607 is a model of digital camera produced by Hewlett-Packard, under the Photosmart line of cameras and photo printers.

The R-series is HP's top line of digital cameras, positioned above the M-series and entry-level E-series.

External links
 

HP digital cameras